Badak Lampung Football Club, commonly known as BLFC, is an Indonesian football club based in Bandar Lampung, Lampung. Their nickname is Saburai Warriors. They play in the Liga 3 in the Indonesian Football League. They play their home matches at Sumpah Pemuda Stadium.

History 
The club was initially established in 1970 as Perseru Serui. In 2010, the club gained promotion to the Premier Division after finishing as the fourth-ranked Liga Indonesia First Division.

In 2013, Perseru achieved its dream to compete at the highest football competition in Indonesia, Indonesia Super League after successfully stepping into the Premier Division Final 2013 season.

In March 2019, Perseru was bought by a businessman in Lampung, since all clubs in Lampung were only competing in third tier league. No clubs in Lampung competed in Liga 1 for decades. Therefore, the club's home base was moved to Lampung, and the club's name was changed from Perseru Serui to Badak Lampung FC. However, they only competed for a year (five years overall) in 2019 Liga 1, and were relegated to Liga 2 for 2020 season.

Sponsorship 
 Sunpride
 Indofood
 M-150
 Kredit Plus

Kit supplier 
 Veldome Sport (2012)
 Injers (2015)
 Junior Sport (2017)
 Noij Sportwear (2018)
 Made by Club (2019)
 MAR10 Apparel (2020)
 Adhoc Apparel (2021−2022)

Stadiums 
 Marora Stadium (2012–2019)
 Sumpah Pemuda Stadium (2019–present)

Honours 
 Liga Indonesia Premier Division:
 Runners-up: 2013

Coaching staff

References

External links

 
Football clubs in Indonesia
Football clubs in Lampung
Association football clubs established in 2019
2019 establishments in Indonesia